Union Lake is a lake in Polk County, in the U.S. state of Minnesota.

Union Lake was so named on account of its three sections being united by narrow channels.

See also
List of lakes in Minnesota

References

Lakes of Minnesota
Lakes of Polk County, Minnesota